The Peech Boys, also known as the New York Citi Peech Boys or NYC Peech Boys, were a band that comprised Bernard Fowler, Steven Brown, Robert Kasper, Darryl Short, Larry Levan and Michael de Benedictus. The group formed at the Paradise Garage, being influenced by Larry Levan. They only released four 12" discs with "On a Journey" peaking at #56 in the 1983 US Hot R&B/Hip-Hop Songs chart. However, they are most known for their 1982 song "Don't Make Me Wait", which was one of the early hits in the New York house/garage scene, due to Levan's playing it at the Paradise Garage. "Don't Make Me Wait" was their only UK Singles Chart entry, peaking at #49 in November 1982. They were signed to the West End Records label, but in 1984 they split up.

Discography

Albums
Life Is Something Special (1983)

Singles

References

External links
 The Peech Boys at Discogs
 [ The Peech Boys - Biography] at Allmusic

American dance music groups
American garage house musicians
American boogie musicians
West End Records artists